Elachista thallophora is a moth in the family Elachistidae. It was described by Edward Meyrick in 1889. It is found in New Zealand.

The wingspan is 8–15 mm. The forewings are pearly white with an ochreous-brown longitudinal streak from the base of the costa, and another from the base in the middle, converging to a point in the disc at four-fifths, where they terminate. There is an ochreous-brown streak along the inner margin from the base to the anal angle. In males, these markings are thicker, darker, and more suffused, and the posterior half of the costa is also suffused with brown. The hindwings are grey.

References

Moths described in 1889
thallophora
Moths of New Zealand
Endemic fauna of New Zealand
Taxa named by Edward Meyrick
Endemic moths of New Zealand